Camp Quality is an Australian non-governmental and non-profit organisation with offices in Sydney, Melbourne, Perth, Adelaide, Newcastle and Brisbane, offering cancer support nationally. Camp Quality enhances the quality of life for children impacted by cancer and their families at every stage of the cancer experience. Camp Quality's programs and services are designed specifically for children aged up to 15 years, and their families, and help and bring positivity, fun and laughter back into their lives. In 2021 there were 9,108 kids and 4,114 families impacted by cancer registered for their programs and services.

Child Safety is of the highest priority at Camp Quality and the organisation has held a National Safeguarding Children's accreditation with the Australian Childhood Foundation (ACF) for 14 years. Camp Quality is a founding member of the Child and Youth Cancer Alliance with CanTeen and RedKite.

The incidence rate of childhood cancer rose by 35 per cent between 1983 and 2014 in Australia  - and it is expected to increase a further seven per cent over the next 20 years. This means that growing numbers of children and families will need the kind of services and support programs that Camp Quality provides to help them cope with a diagnosis of cancer.

Camp Quality is registered as a charity by the Australian Charities and Not-For-Profits Commission as a public benevolent institution, and is endorsed as a deductible gift recipient.

History 
Camp Quality was founded by Vera Entwistle in Australia in 1983. The name of the organisation was sourced from a conversation with a pediatric oncologist, who told Entwistle that "No one can do anything about the quantity of life, but we all can do something about the quality." With the support of a team of passionate volunteers, Camp Quality has been improving the quality of life for kids impacted by cancer, and their families, for almost 40 years.

Entwistle later introduced Camp Quality to several countries, including the United States and Canada.

Programs and services

Recreation programs 
Camp Quality is best known for their camps which are run across Australia giving kids and families impacted by cancer precious time away to reconnect, build resilience and create happy memories together.

 Kids’ Camps, for children diagnosed with cancer and their siblings, are filled with fun and optimism. It is a chance for kids to be kids again and make friends with other children who understand what they are going through. 
 Family Camps enable the whole family to enjoy quality time together and reconnect. They are a chance to build a supportive community with other families facing cancer. 
 Family Retreats across Australia offer precious time away for families to be together in holiday accommodation. This is often the first break from cancer a family has experienced since diagnosis and gives them the opportunity to spend quality time together. 
 Kids Impacted by a Carer's Cancer (KICC) programs include Kids’ Camps, Family Camps and Family Fun Days for children under 16 dealing with a parent's cancer diagnosis. 
 Family Fun Days and Family Experiences are one-day events that enable families to create happy new memories together that are not centred on illness.
 Virtual Camps are live-streamed, online entertainment experiences, bringing the fun of camp to kids isolated by cancer.

In hospital support 
Camp Quality funds are also used to give kids diagnosed with cancer in hospital emotional and psychological support during their treatment. These programs include:

 Child Life Therapists provide medical play techniques that build understanding, resilience and empowerment to help kids cope with the hospital environment. They teach techniques that reduce a child's anxiety about the procedures they face, decreasing stress and the need for sedation. 
 Hospital Puppet Playdates are visits from the lovable Camp Quality Puppets. The puppets bring fun and distraction to children at their hospital bedside, boosting their wellbeing through laughter.  
 The Beads of Courage Program, at Randwick Children's Hospital and John Hunter Hospital, provides kids with unique beads to track their courageous cancer story.

Puppet programs 
The Camp Quality Puppets bring laughter and joy to kids at school, in hospital and online.

 The Cancer Education Program visits primary and preschools across Australia to deliver cancer education that dispels myths.  Independent assessment shows that performances by the Camp Quality Puppets in schools decrease bullying, absenteeism, and mental health issues. The Cancer Education Digital Program is also available to schools via streaming platforms.
 Hospital Puppet Playdates are visits from our puppets to kids in hospital, providing therapeutic laughter and fun. Digital Puppet Playdates are online versions of these joyful interactions, live-streamed via a child's personal device.
 Teacher Resources include a suite of educations resources aligned with the Australian Curriculum, Early Years Learning Framework and state-based curriculums, that continue the age-appropriate cancer education after a Camp Quality Puppet school visit.

Digital resources and counselling 
Camp Quality offers a number of services to provide kids and families with 24/7 support

 The Parenting Through Cancer website gives parents access to a supportive online community and useful resources. We also provide a free telephone counselling service for parents impacted by their own cancer diagnosis, or their child's.
 The Kids’ Guide to Cancer app is a valuable tool for parents to help answer the most common questions children have about cancer in a safe, interactive and educational way.  
 The New Normal Navigator app gives parents of diagnosed children the resources to help them adjust to ‘a new normal’ on returning home from hospital.
 The Happiness Hub  section of our website is home to Camp Quality's exclusive kids’ activities, stories read out loud, and cancer education puppet videos.
 The Cancer Hub is a service from the Child and Youth Cancer Alliance formed by Camp Quality, Canteen and RedKite. It offers a streamlined digital service with dedicated cancer navigators, to help families impacted by cancer access practical and emotional support – via an innovative ‘one-stop’ platform.

Fundraising 
In the 2019 financial year, Camp Quality reported total income of $14.1 million, derived from events & community fundraising (28%), corporate income (24%), general donations (16%), volunteer contributions (18%), private & government grants (7%), ORANGES Toolkit revenue (4%), and bequests (3%).

References

Cancer organisations based in Australia
Cancer charities in the United States
Organizations established in 1983